Francavilla al Mare is a comune and town in the province of Chieti, in the Abruzzo region of Italy.
 
The municipality, included in the urban area of Pescara, borders with Chieti, Miglianico, Ortona, Pescara, Ripa Teatina, San Giovanni Teatino and Torrevecchia Teatina.

History 
The area was inhabited since prehistory, and early remains have been found at St. Cecilia. In 1162 the village was granted immunity from taxes for 12 years, and this episode also gave origin to the name "Francavilla" (meaning "free town").
 
The harbour was a flourishing commercial key point in the Adriatic Sea, but in the 16th century was plundered by Turkish troops. The town was held by families such as the Caracciolo and D'Avalos in the following centuries.
 
In the late 19th century Francavilla was already a well known seaside resort and the seat of an artistic literary circle with relevant figures as Francesco Paolo Michetti, Gabriele D'Annunzio, F.P. Tosti, who met at the "Conventino", in the former monastery of Santa Maria di Gesù.

In 1944 the centre was destroyed by Americans and Nazi. Only Michetti convent is conserved between the city is totally built from new.

Main sights 
Michetti Convent
Michetti Museum
Church of Santa Maria Maggiore
Sirena Palace

Sport 
The local football club is the A.S.D. Francavilla, founded in 1927, that has its home ground in Valle Anzuca Stadium.

People 
Guido Celano (1904–1988), actor
Francesco Paolo Michetti (1851–1929), painter
Antonio Russo (1960–2000), journalist

References

External links 

Official website 
Francavilla a Mare on comuni-italiani.it 

Cities and towns in Abruzzo
Coastal towns in Abruzzo